Alexei Rudeanu (April 12, 1939 – January 2, 2013) was a Romanian author.

Works
 Exilul Pisicilor (1969)
 Ultimul Monac (1973)
 Focul rece (1973)
 Destine din nord (1974)
 Pietrele acestel case (1975)
 Mansarda colibei (1976)
 Fratele norocos (1980)
 Rusinea familiea (1983)
 Maraton spre fericire (2007)  (as Aleksander Mertz)

References

1939 births
2013 deaths
Writers from Chișinău